WQKA-LP (92.9 FM) is a radio station licensed to serve the community of Pulteney, New York. The station is owned by Keuka Broadcasters, Inc. It airs a variety radio format.

The station was assigned the WQKA-LP call letters by the Federal Communications Commission on February 11, 2014.

References

External links
 Official Website
 

QKA-LP
QKA-LP
Radio stations established in 2014
2014 establishments in New York (state)
Variety radio stations in the United States
Steuben County, New York